The second season of Body of Proof, an American television series created by Christopher Murphey, commenced airing in the United States on September 20, 2011, concluded April 10, 2012, and consisted of 20 episodes. It follows the life and career of Dr. Megan Hunt, a medical examiner, once a neurosurgeon, who now works in Philadelphia's Medical Examiner's office after a car accident ended her neurosurgery career. Along with Hunt solving homicide cases are her colleagues, Nicholas Bishop as Peter Dunlop, Jeri Ryan as Dr. Kate Murphy, John Carroll Lynch and Sonja Sohn as Detective's Bud Morris and Samantha Baker and fellow medical examiners, Geoffrey Arend as Dr. Ethan Gross and Windell Middlebrooks as Dr. Curtis Brumfield. Mary Mouser who plays Megan's daughter Lacey was promoted to "regular" from "recurring" status from season 1.  Jeffrey Nordling who plays Megan's ex-husband Todd, Joanna Cassidy who plays her mother Joan and Eric Sheffer Stevens who plays Bill Parkson all reprise their roles, whilst Cliff Curtis, Nathalie Kelley and Jamie Bamber join the show, all of which appear on a "recurring" basis.

Cast and characters

Episodes

Ratings

United States

United Kingdom

DVD release
When the DVD was released, Monsters and Critics said of the season, "The second season of Body of Proof takes what worked with the first season and continues to build on the premise. The series still feels formulaic to me, but the cast make it worth taking the time to watch and help it overcome any short comings. The second season sees more medical mysteries and twist with each episode as Dr. Megan Hunt (Dana Delany) and her team are back to handle everything from a child kidnapping to a murder where the entire city could be suspect. Along with murder and other crimes, the team deals with a new romance and Hunt continues to work around strained relationships with her ex-husband and boss. The series still feels formulaic and doesn't quite fire on all cylinders for me, but season two was an improvement. The series leaves you wanting to see what will happen in season three.

References

External links

2011 American television seasons
2012 American television seasons
2